Levante Unión Deportiva Fútbol Playa is a beach soccer club based in Valencia, Spain. Founded in 2013, the team is the official beach soccer department of Levante UD association football club. The club competes in the Spanish National Beach Soccer League (Liga Nacional de Fútbol Playa), Copa RFEF and international competitions.

The club has won two league titles and as of February 2020, is ranked as the second best club side in Europe.

Squad
2019 National League squad.

Coach:  Enrique Sánchez

Achievements

Domestic competitions
Liga Nacional
 Winners (2): 2018, 2019
 Runners-up (1): 2017

Copa RFEF
 Winners (1): 2019
Runners-up (2): 2015, 2018
Third place (1): 2017

Supercopa de España
 Winners (1): 2019

International competitions
Euro Winners Cup
 Third place (1): 2019

World Winners Cup
 Third place (1): 2019

See also
Levante UD Femenino
Levante UD (futsal)

References

External links
  
  Levante UD, profile at LNFP.es
  Levante, profile at BSRussia
  Official Twitter account

Levante UD
Beach soccer in Spain
Beach soccer clubs
Sport in Valencia